Princess Maria Sophia of Thurn and Taxis (4 March 1800, Regensburg – 20 December 1870, Regensburg) was a member of the House of Thurn and Taxis and a Princess of Thurn and Taxis by birth and a member of the House of Württemberg and a Duchess of Württemberg through her marriage to Duke Paul Wilhelm of Württemberg, a German naturalist and explorer.

Family
Maria Sophia was the fifth child and fourth daughter of Karl Alexander, 5th Prince of Thurn and Taxis, and his wife, Duchess Therese of Mecklenburg-Strelitz. She was a younger sister of Maximilian Karl, 6th Prince of Thurn and Taxis and Maria Theresia, Princess Esterházy of Galántha.

Marriage and issue
Maria Sophia married her second cousin Duke Paul Wilhelm of Württemberg, the fifth and youngest child of Duke Eugen of Württemberg and his wife, Princess Luise of Stolberg-Gedern., on 17 April 1827 in Regensburg. Maria Sophia and Paul Wilhelm had one son:

 Duke Wilhelm Ferdinand Maximilian Karl of Württemberg (Schloss Taxis 3 September  1828 – Regensburg 28 July 1888); married Princess Hermine of Schaumburg-Lippe, eldest child of Adolf I, Prince of Schaumburg-Lippe

Maria Sophia and Paul Wilhelm divorced on 2 May 1835. Following her divorce, Maria Sophia acquired Württembergisches Palais and its adjacent Herzogspark in Regensburg. She made her residence at the Württembergisches Palais until her death.

Ancestry

References

External links
 Photograph of Princess Maria Sophia of Thurn and Taxis

1800 births
1870 deaths
People from Regensburg
Princesses of Thurn und Taxis
German Roman Catholics
Duchesses of Württemberg